An Autumn's Tale is a 1987 Hong Kong romantic drama film set in New York City starring Chow Yun-fat, Cherie Chung, and Danny Chan. The film is Mabel Cheung's second directorial effort after her "migration trilogy."

The film won the Hong Kong Film Award for Best Film, Best Cinematography (James Hayman and David Chung) and Best Screenplay (Alex Law); Chow was nominated for Best Actor for three films that same year, but won for his performance in Prison on Fire. On the other hand, Chow won his second Golden Horse Award for Best Actor for his role in this film in 1987. Cherie Chung was nominated for Best Actress and Lowell Lo was nominated for Best Original Score, respectively. The film was ranked #49 on the Hong Kong Film Awards' Best 100 Chinese Motion Pictures.

Plot

Jennifer Lee (Chung) travels from Hong Kong to New York City with plans to study with her boyfriend, Vincent (Chan). Samuel Pang (Chow) is a relative of Jennifer who arrives at the airport with two friends, Cow and Bull, to pick her up. Not comprehending the airport security officer, Pang shouts welcoming Japanese phrases in hopes of getting inside. Illegally parking his car at a no-parking zone, Pang rushes his friends to escort Jennifer from the airport.

Arriving at her apartment, Pang introduces Jennifer to her room. He warns her to be careful using the fridge, as it is run by gas, which is constantly leaking, but his voice is muffled by a passing train. Pang leaves letting Jennifer know that she may stamp on the floor if she needs anything, as he lives downstairs.

The next day, Jennifer wakes Pang up to have him show her how to take a train to meet Vincent. Pang jokes the train station is like a labyrinth and is dangerous for a girl like her to go there by herself. He insists on driving her to the train station. Waiting for Jennifer to change, he comments women are "cha bo", meaning trouble. Pang ridicules Jennifer for not knowing English.

Waiting in the train station, she sees Vincent with a girl named Peggy (Cindy Ou). Anxiously, Jennifer attempts to hide from Vincent but is caught before she could walk out from him. Vincent did not expect to see Jennifer at the train station, or he would have not been to Boston to see a baseball game with his girlfriend. Vincent felt it was childish of Jennifer to travel to New York City to send him a box of dolls from Hong Kong. Infuriated, Jennifer walks back to the car and throws the box of dolls onto the street. Pang's car runs over the dolls as they depart.

Later that night, Pang answers a call from Vincent because Jennifer would not answer. He told Jennifer to meet with him for lunch at Silver Palace restaurant the next day. Coincidentally, Pang works as a busboy at the restaurant and overhears their conversations. After saving enough money, Jennifer meant to study in New York as a means to be with Vincent. Vincent tells Jennifer to explore the city and meet new people, rather than follow him everywhere. When he tells her this, she finds out he is leaving for Boston tomorrow.

Depressed, Jennifer goes home and makes a pot of tea; the fridge is not closed properly. Pang smells gas from upstairs and investigates; he finds a passed-out Jennifer. He takes her downstairs and has someone call the fire department. Seeing Jennifer lovesick for Vincent, Pang takes her out for a walk.

The next day, Jennifer goes to a restaurant in Chinatown. While she eats an egg sandwich, Pang walks in and sees her too; Jennifer disregards having eye contact with him and turns aside. Pang is about to sit with Jennifer, only to have a friend from another table call him. Pang greets them and moves toward Jennifer's table. He tries a piece of Jennifer's egg sandwich and calls a staff member over to order extra plates of food for both of them, for no extra charge. Pang helps Jennifer build a bookcase and decorate her room. She tells him she found a part-time job as a babysitter to pay for her rent, but would need a second job for her tuition and other expenses. He finds her grandfather's watch, but the strap is worn. Unsure she has enough money for a watchstrap, let alone a Broadway show, Pang goes to buy tickets for her the next morning. Not knowing Jennifer was busy, he did not have a chance to tell her he had tickets for the show, he tried to sell the tickets, claiming they were for Bull, when she asked.

Jennifer alights a NJ Transit bus to help Pang, who is being questioned by an NYPD officer outside the theatre, but ends up running late for her babysitting job, so Pang insists on driving her there. He stripped the car and rebuilt it, so she would not have to hold onto the broken door. They arrive at the home of the child Chung has been hired to babysit, but Jennifer is too anxious to enter. She asks Pang to accompany her.

Pang spent all his money and asks Cow and Bull to give him some money to gamble. Bull is reluctant to give some because he wants to save it for his new restaurant. Bull pays the gangs $400 each week, but is still not enough from keeping them from destroying his property.

Tony, one of Mrs. Sherwood's (Gigi Wong) boyfriends, wants to hire Jennifer as a waitress for his restaurant. Pang is suspicious of the owner, but offers to try the restaurant. Jennifer assures him it is not necessary, but would love for him to visit her there. Pang declines, with work on his mind. He later visits Jennifer, and is led to an expensive restaurant called "The Big Panda". Unable to read the English menu, he has the waiter order a simple meal for him. The waiter suggests a high-priced array of dishes, which Pang reluctantly agrees to.

While babysitting Anna (Joyce Houseknecht), Tony visits Jennifer and walks with her into the garden. Mrs. Sherwood recently came home and sees Tony flirting with Jennifer, and calls for her to leave immediately. Having heard about Jennifer losing her babysitting job, Pang and his friends go to The Big Panda restaurant and beat up the owner.

They spend their morning trying to sell her dolls for money. Walking past a vendor, Jennifer sees a watchband she likes; unfortunately, it is out of her budget ($800). At the park, she sees Vincent with Peggy but wants to flee. She asks Pang if she looks better than Peggy. Pang explains that he doesn't care how others looked, nor how others looked at him, as long as he kept his dignity. He told Jennifer that it was his dream to open a restaurant on a pier on the beach, and name it Sampan.

The next morning, Pang writes on his bedroom mirror three commandments and five goals; one goal being "If you want it, go for it", in this case Pang going for "cha bo", Jennifer.

Pang is holding a party, and invites Jennifer, but does not tell her it is his birthday. Vincent heard she was at a party, so he talked with Jennifer the entire night. The conversation became awkward when he mentioned he broke up with Peggy. Pang, serving guests leaves because he does not think he will have a chance with Jennifer. He went drinking and gambling until Bull asks for more money to pay off the gangs. Frustrated, Pang gathered a group of friends to drive in search of the gang and beat them up.

Jennifer wanders into Pang's room and sees a mirror with his handwriting on it. He wrote his name, age, and birthday in English. Feeling lonely, she walks across a park and sees Anna at her school. Mrs. Sherwood greets Jennifer and acknowledges that it was Tony who flirted with her. She invites Jenny to move in with the family on Long Island.

Pang comes back to his apartment the next morning and finds Jennifer's graduation certificate. To congratulate her, he buys the watchband as a gift. The old man did not accept his offer, so Pang sold his car for the watchband. Excited to see Jennifer with the gift, he runs to her apartment only to see Vincent helping Jennifer move furniture in his car. She gives him her address. They exchange gifts and Pang assumes she has gotten back together with Vincent. After hesitation Pang runs after her after she leaves. Unable to catch up as the car turns up the highway ramp, he walks to a beach. He opens his gift and finds her grandfather's watch. Soon Jennifer opens her gift and realizes it is the watch band she had wanted and cries.

Some time afterwards, Jenny is walking with Anna at the same beach she had visited with Samuel. To Jennifer's surprise, they come across a restaurant on the pier called Sampan. Jennifer walks up to the restaurant and approaches Samuel. After calming himself down, Pang asks her, "Table for two?"

Cast

Main Cast:

 Chow Yun-fat as Samuel Pang aka "Sampan"
 Cherie Chung as Jennifer Lee
 Danny Chan as Vincent, Jennifer's boyfriend

Secondary Cast:

 Cindy Ou (also transliterated as Wu Fu-sheng) as Peggy, Vincent's other girlfriend
 Arthur Fulbright  (also transliterated as Ching Yungcho) as Samuel Pang's friend
  as Mrs. Sherwood
 Chan Yui-yin
 Joyce Houseknecht as Anna Sherwood, daughter of Mrs. Sherwood
 Wong Man as Jennifer's mother (cameo)
 Brenda Lo as May Chu, Jennifer's friend (cameo)
 Tom Hsiung
Tai Leung as Chinatown restaurant staff

Ending
The ending of the film shows that Jennifer and Pang exchanged gifts. Pang gave the beautiful watch band while Jennifer gave him her grandfather's watch. This was based on  
The Gift of the Magi by American short story writer O. Henry.

At the end of the film, a sign on the right of Samuel Pang's restaurant, "Sampan", is mislabelled as "Sampman".

Filming locations

 Williamsburg Bridge - bridge where Pang and Lee drive over as well as passing shots during film
 Brooklyn Bridge - bridge where Pang runs to chase after car with Jennifer and Vincent
 Manhattan Bridge - night view from archways at Adam Street and Monroe Street
 John V. Lindsay East River Park and/or Brooklyn Bridge Park - park scenes involving Pang, Lee
 Hoboken Terminal - train station Vincent arrives with Peggy
 New York Public Library Main Branch - location where Pang and Lee sell the hand made dolls
 Newark Airport - pickup area where Pang parks his car
 New York City Chinatown - various restaurant scenes (inside and out)
 Lower East Side (73 Monroe St) - location of Samuel Pang's home
 Greenwich Street - where Big Panda was located and scenes facing then World Trade Centre
 Metropolitan Opera House - passing shot
 Ocean Grove Pier, New Jersey - SAMPAN restaurant.
 East River Promenade, New York - Flower for Jennifer by old man.

Cars

The first car driven by Pang is a two door Pontiac Ventura Spirit, followed by a larger Cadillac convertible.

Box office
The film grossed HK$25,546,552 at the Hong Kong box office during its theatrical run from 16 July to 25 August 1987.

Awards and nominations

See also
 List of Hong Kong films

Literature

Footnotes

References

External links
 
 
 
 
An Autumn's Tale at the Hong Kong Cinemagic
 Movie stills from Japan version, 2010

1987 films
Hong Kong romantic drama films
1987 romantic drama films
1980s Cantonese-language films
Best Film HKFA
Films set in New York City
Films shot in New York City
Films directed by Mabel Cheung
1980s Hong Kong films
Foreign films set in the United States